Gunnesbo Station is a commuter train railway station in the Gunnesbo district of Lund in Sweden. The station was inaugurated on 1June 1986 in order to serve commuters in the newly built districts Nöbbelöv and Gunnesbo along the West Coast Line. The local trains (Pågatåg) serve the station.

The station was expanded in 2003–2005 for the double track that now runs through Lund along the West Coast Line.

See also
Rail transport in Sweden

References

Railway stations in Lund
Railway stations on the West Coast Line (Sweden)
Railway stations opened in 1986
1986 establishments in Sweden
Buildings and structures in Lund
Buildings and structures completed in 1986
20th-century establishments in Skåne County